Pat Thomas, i.e. Patrick or Patricia Thomas may refer to:

 Patrick Thomas (conductor) (1932–2017), Australian orchestral conductor
 Patrick Thomas (actor) (born 1961), American 
 Patrick Thomas (graphic artist) (born 1965), English
 Pat Thomas (boxer) (born 1950), Welsh 
 Pat Thomas (defensive back) (born 1954), American footballer
 Pat Thomas (journalist) (born 1959), American author, journalist and campaigner
 Pat Thomas (linebacker) (born 1983), American footballer
 Pat Thomas (pianist) (born 1960), British
 Pat Thomas (musician) (born 1964), American music journalist and musician
 Pat Thomas (Ghanaian musician), Ghanaian vocalist and songwriter
 Pat Thomas (politician) (1933–2000), North Florida politician 
 Pat Thomas (singer) (died 1992), American jazz singer
 Patrick Thomas (businessman) (born 1947), French business executive
 Pat Thomas (dancer) (1922-2014)

See also 
 Thomas (surname)